The 2008 Kentucky Derby was the 134th running of the Kentucky Derby. The race took place on May 3, 2008 with 157,770 in attendance, the second largest in Derby history. Post time was 6:15 p.m. EDT and was televised in the United States on the NBC television network.

Big Brown won the race by nearly 5 lengths. Eight Belles, the second-place finisher and the first filly to run the Derby in nine years, was euthanized following the end of the race after fracturing both front ankles while galloping out. It is believed to be the first fatality in Kentucky Derby history.

Payout

The 134th Kentucky Derby Payout Schedule

 $2 Exacta (20-5)  Paid  $141.60
 $2 Trifecta (20-5-16)  Paid  $3,445.60
 $2 Superfecta (20-5-16-2)  Paid   $58,737.80

Field 
Big Brown was made the 2-1 favorite off the strength of his win in the Florida Derby. Other leading contenders included Colonel John (Santa Anita Derby), Pyro (Louisiana Derby), and the filly Eight Belles (Fantasy Stakes).

Subsequent Grade I wins
Several horses recorded Grade I wins after the Derby.
 Big Brown – Preakness Stakes, Haskell Invitational
 Bob Black Jack – Malibu Stakes
 Colonel John – Travers Stakes
 Court Vision – Hollywood Derby, 2009 Turf Mile Stakes, 2010 Breeders' Cup Mile, Gulfstream Park Turf Handicap, Woodbine Mile
 Gayego – 2009 Ancient Title Stakes
 Pyro – 2009 Forego Stakes
 Tale of Ekati – Cigar Mile
 Visionaire – King's Bishop Stakes

Subsequent breeding careers
Leading progeny of participants in the 2008 Kentucky Derby
Big Brown (1st)
 Dortmund – Los Alamitos Futurity, Santa Anita Derby. 3rd in 2015 Kentucky Derby

Colonel John (6th)
 La Coronel – Queen Elizabeth II Challenge Stakes

Court Vision (13th)
 Storm the Court – 2019 American champion 3yo, Breeders' Cup Juvenile
 Mr. Havercamp – 2018 Canadian champion older horse
 King and His Court – 2016 Canadian champion 2yo

Tale of Ekati (4th)
 Girvin – Haskell Invitational

Sources: American Classic Pedigrees, Equibase, Blood-Horse Stallion Register

See also

 2008 Preakness Stakes
 2008 Belmont Stakes

References

External links
 

2008
Kentucky Derby
Derby
Kentucky Derby